Donato Guimbaolibot (December 5, 1866 – September 9, 1949) was a Catholic priest from the Roman Catholic Diocese of Borongan and the vicar general of the Roman Catholic Diocese of Calbayog. He became known for his efforts in building up Guiuan, Eastern Samar. He is also called as The Saintly Priest of Balangiga and was involved with the Balangiga Massacre controversies. In 1995, the Parish Church of Guiuan formally launched a beatification movement for Donato Guimbaolibot to the Vatican Council. Guimbaolibot is now revered to as Servant of God in many parts of the Samar and Leyte Regions.

Guimbaolibot is now revered to as Servant of God in many parts of the Samar and Leyte, while still waiting for an official diocesan opening with the cause of martyrdom ex acertatibus et vexationibusque pro fidei quibus pertulit, which means that he died a martyr as a result of physical/moral violence he endured for the sake of the  faith.

References

1866 births
1949 deaths
20th-century Filipino Roman Catholic priests
Filipino Servants of God
20th-century venerated Christians
20th-century Roman Catholic martyrs
People from Eastern Samar